The Nandi Award for Best Choreographer winners since 1985:

References

Choreographer
Indian choreography awards